Scott L. Smith Jr. (born 26 May 1983) is a Catholic American author and attorney. Smith is the author of several books of Catholic theology and devotion including Consecration to St. Joseph for Children and Families co-authored with Fr. Donald Calloway, Pray the Rosary with St. John Paul II, The Catholic ManBook, and a new translation of the Preparation for Total Consecration according to Saint Louis de Montfort. He currently serves as the Chairman of the Men of the Immaculata.

Career and personal life
Smith graduated from Edmond Memorial High School in 2001 and Texas A&M University in 2006 with a degree in chemical engineering. He then entered the Jesuit Novitiate in Grand Coteau, Louisiana. Smith received his Masters in Theology at Notre Dame Seminary in New Orleans, Louisiana, where he studied under Dr. Brant J. Pitre. He received his juris doctor from the Paul M. Hebert Law Center of Louisiana State University in 2013.

Smith served as an Assistant Attorney General with the Office of the Louisiana Attorney General from 2015 to 2019 before entering private practice.

Smith lives in New Roads, Louisiana with his wife Sara Ashton LaGrone and their five children. He is a 13th generation resident of New Roads, Louisiana, seat of Pointe Coupee Parish. Smith's ancestor Jean Baptiste Pourciau immigrated to Pointe Coupee Parish in 1720 from the Diocese of Cambrai, France.

Writing projects
In 2010, Smith began a series of articles exploring the Lembas waybread as a symbol for the Eucharist in The Lord of the Rings by J. R. R. Tolkien. The Lembas, for example, originated as a waybread for the Elves' Great Journey to the Undying Lands, as the Manna was the waybread for the Israelites during the Exodus to the Promised Land. These articles were eventually published as an anthology entitled Lord of the Rings and the Eucharist. Actor Kevin O'Brien, who has portrayed J. R. R. Tolkien on EWTN and elsewhere, narrated the audiobook version of Lord of the Rings and the Eucharist.

Since 2010, Smith has worked as freelance essayist and lecturer on Biblical topics, including typology, Mariology, and Biblical references in contemporary books and movies. Smith has written extensively on the Virgin Mary and is a frequent lecturer on the subject.

Smith has written on Catholic and Christian themes appearing in comics, science fiction, and current movies. A collection of his articles on these topics was recently published as The Theology of Sci-Fi: The Christian's Guide to the Galaxy.

In 2018, Smith collaborated with Louisiana historian Brian J. Costello on a series of biographies of holy men and beatified people, entitled Blessed Is He Who ...: Models of Catholic Manhood.

As of 2019, Smith is serving as the co-host of the Catholic Nerds Podcast. On Episode 5, the Catholic Nerds interviewed Zac Mabry, who played "Porky" in the 1994 film The Little Rascals, about his conversion to Catholicism.

Smith co-authored with Fr. Donald Calloway the Consecration to St. Joseph for Children and Families.

As a pioneer of the Catholic Horror subgenre, Smith is also the author of several horror novels, including The Seventh Word and The Cajun Zombie Chronicles. His novels are all set in a fictionalized version of his hometown of New Roads, Louisiana.

Awards
Smith's blog was awarded the 2018 Fisher's Net award for "Best Blog".

Bibliography

Non-fiction

Sole author 
 The Catholic ManBook, originally published 2017, Holy Water Books, 
 St. Louis de Montfort's Total Consecration to Jesus through Mary - New Easier-to-Read Translation, 2019, Holy Water Books, Marian Consecration Guide, 
 Lord of the Rings and the Eucharist, 2019, Holy Water Books, The Catholic Theology of J. R. R. Tolkien, 
 Pray the Rosary with Saint John Paul II, 2020, Holy Water Books, 
 Pray Like a Warrior: Spiritual Combat & War Room Prayer Guide, 2020, Holy Water Books, 
 The Theology of Sci-Fi: The Christian's Guide to the Galaxy, 2020, Holy Water Books, The Theology of Dune, The Theology of Star Wars,

Collaborative works 
 Consecration to St. Joseph for Children and Families with co-author Fr. Donald Calloway
 Blessed Is He Who ...: Models of Catholic Manhood, Brian J. Costello and Scott L. Smith Jr., Holy Water Books, 2018, including a biography of Blessed Carlo Acutis, 
 Pray, Hope, & Don't Worry Prayer Journal for Catholic Women: A 52-Week Guided Devotional Through Scripture and the Saints to Overcome Anxiety, Sara A. Smith and Scott L. Smith Jr., Holy Water Books, 2020, 
 Pray, Hope, & Don't Worry Women's Prayer Journal For Overcoming Anxiety: A 52-week Guided Devotional of Prayers & Bible Verses to Conquer Stress & Fear, Sara A. Smith and Scott L. Smith Jr., 2020,

Fiction 
 The Seventh Word, Holy Water Books, 2016, 
 The Cajun Zombie Chronicles, the first of which is The River Dead, Holy Water Books, 2016,

References

External links
Official blog of Scott L. Smith Jr. with archived articles
Aleteia Online: Scott Smith archive
Catholic Commentator: Scott Smith archive
Big Pulpit: Scott Smith archive

1983 births
American male non-fiction writers
21st-century American novelists
American horror writers
American male novelists
21st-century American male writers
People from New Roads, Louisiana
Living people
Texas A&M University alumni
Writers from Louisiana
Catholics from Louisiana
21st-century American non-fiction writers
21st-century American Roman Catholic theologians
Christian apologists